The canton of Maripasoula (French: Canton de Maripasoula) is one of the former cantons of the Guyane department in French Guiana. It was located in the arrondissement of Saint-Laurent-du-Maroni, and consisted of five communes. Its administrative seat was located in Maripasoula. Its population was 29,504 in 2012.

It was the largest canton by geographic area, comparable in size to the metropolitan region of Auvergne or the country of Belgium. In addition to other cantons of French Guiana, it shared borders with both Suriname and Brazil.

Communes 

The canton was composed of 5 communes:
Maripasoula
Apatou
Grand-Santi
Papaichton
Saül

Administration

References

Maripasoula